Henry Lincoln Wilder (June 6, 1883 – December 9, 1962) was an American football and basketball coach and newspaper publisher. He served as three stints as head football coach at Lebanon Valley College in Annville Township, Lebanon County, Pennsylvania (1906–1907, 1911–1912, 1921–1922), compiling a record of 13–33–3. Wilder also three stints as the head basketball coach at Lebanon Valley (1906–1908, 1909–1910, 1911–1912).  He also coached football for ten seasons at Lebanon High School in Lebanon, Pennsylvania and for one season at Conway Hall, a prep school of Dickinson College.

Wilder was the publisher of the Lebanon Daily News.  He died on December 9, 1962, of a heart attack while visiting friends in Sinking Spring, Pennsylvania.

Head coaching record

College football

References

1883 births
1962 deaths
20th-century American newspaper publishers (people)
Basketball coaches from Massachusetts
Lebanon Valley Flying Dutchmen football coaches
Lebanon Valley Flying Dutchmen men's basketball coaches
High school football coaches in Pennsylvania
Columbia University alumni
Dickinson College alumni
Lebanon Valley College alumni
People from Hingham, Massachusetts
Players of American football from Massachusetts
Sportspeople from Plymouth County, Massachusetts